The northern Flinders Ranges froglet (Crinia flindersensis), or Flinders Springs froglet, is a species of small frog that is endemic to Australia.

Description
The species grows up to about 25 mm in length (SVL). Colouration is brown on the back, with darker patches; the belly is white with small brown spots; the male has a grey-brown throat. The fingers and toes are unwebbed.

Behaviour
Eggs are laid beneath rocks in slow-flowing creeks.

Distribution and habitat
The species occurs in the northern Flinders Ranges of South Australia.

References

 
Crinia
Amphibians of South Australia
Amphibians described in 2012
Frogs of Australia